The Right Combination may refer to:
 The Right Combination (Linda Clifford and Curtis Mayfield album)
 The Right Combination (Joe Albany album)
 The Right Combination • Burning the Midnight Oil, a collaborative album by Porter Wagoner and Dolly Parton
 The Right Combination (song), a song by Seiko and Donnie Wahlberg